Brigadier General Donald Dunwody Blackburn (September 14, 1916 – May 24, 2008) was a United States Army Special Forces officer, best known for his significant command and developmental roles in the U.S. Army Special Forces.

He was also the commander of the highly classified Studies and Observations Group from 1965 to 1966. Since most of his military career involved clandestine operations, many of Blackburn's exploits remain unknown to the general public.

PERSONAL DATA 

 Birth: 14 September 1916, West Palm Beach, FL
 Mother: Mrs. Charlotte Blackburn
 Father: Deceased
 Marriage: 4 December 1945
 Wife: Ann Smith, Columbus, GA
 Children: Donald, Jr.; Susan
 Legal Residence: Florida
 Death: 24 May 2008, Sarasota, FL

Army service
Donald Blackburn was commissioned a second lieutenant in the Infantry Reserve on May 30, 1938, and entered into active duty with the Army September 22, 1940, assigned to the 24th Infantry at Fort Benning, Georgia.

World War II

At the outbreak of World War II, he was serving as an advisor to a battalion of the 12th Infantry Regiment, Philippine Commonwealth Army.

Upon the fall of Bataan in April 1942, he evaded capture with his friend Captain Russell W. Volckmann, and until October 1945 conducted the Commonwealth military and guerrilla warfare on the island of Luzon. During this latter period, he reorganized and commanded the 11th Infantry Regiment, Philippine Commonwealth Army, which was integrated in October 1945 as a regular unit in the Philippine Commonwealth Army, under Major Eulogio Balao.

In January 1945, Blackburn established his headquarters in Tuao, building a C-47 airfield, roads, and re-establishing schools and hospitals in the Kalinga, Bontoc, Cagayan and Apayao.  By March 1945, Blackburn's regiment consisted of 5000 soldiers and guerrillas, including Igorots and Bolomen.  Blackburn's men supported Sixth United States Army Force B in the capture of Aparri on 20 June 1945.  Blackburn was awarded the Silver Star after he led his men in the capture of Mayoyao, Ifugao, a stronghold of General Mikami's forces in August 1945.  Blackburn's forces received the surrender of Generals Mikami's and Marauka's forces on 14 August.

Postwar
Following World War II Blackburn served in various command and staff assignments. He was assigned to the Department of Military Psychology and Leadership, Tactical Department, United States Military Academy, in 1950. During 1953, he attended the Armed Forces Staff College, Norfolk, Va.  He was then assigned to NATO's Allied Forces Northern Europe, Oslo, Norway. He was promoted to the rank of colonel (O-6) on 20 July 1955.  On return to the United States in 1956, he was assigned as commanding officer, 3rd Training Regiment, Fort Jackson, S.C.

Vietnam War

In 1957, he was assigned to MAAG, Vietnam, and served as the senior advisor to the commanding general, 5th Military Region (Mekong Delta). In October 1958, he was assigned as commanding officer, 77th Special Forces Group (now the 7th SFG) where he was instrumental in initiating Special Forces operations in Southeast Asia. In 1959, as commander of the 77th SFG, Blackburn spearheaded Operation Hotfoot and it follow on, Operation White Star, in Laos.  Operation White Star, which lasted from July 1959 to October 1962, used U.S. Army Special Forces to support the Royal Laotian government in operations against the Pathet Lao communist insurgency.  

Following his command of the 77th SFG, Blackburn attended the 1960 class of the National War College and graduated in 1961.  He then served as deputy director of developments for Special Warfare, Office of the Chief of Research and Development from 1961 to 1964.  He was then was reassigned to the office, Deputy Chief of Staff for Operations as Director of Special Warfare. Blackburn was SOG Commander (Studies and Observations Group) Military Assistance Command, Vietnam, from May 1965 to May 1966.  On 7 January 1968, Blackburn was promoted to brigadier general. 

In 1969 Blackburn was appointed as Special Assistant for Counterinsurgency and Special Activities (SACSA) and acted as the primary advisor to the Chairman of the Joint Chiefs of Staff on special operations.  In that capacity, he assembled the first Operation White Star Mobile Training Teams. The first iteration was led by Bull Simons whom he had first gotten to know from the Philippines.  While in the position, he authorized and oversaw the initial election of the Son Tay POW Camp for Operation Ivory Coast in 1970, briefing General Earle Wheeler, then Chairman of the Joint Chiefs of Staff. He was part of the briefing of National Security Advisor Henry Kissinger. He is the one that chose Air Force BG Leroy J. Manor as overall commander of the raid, Bull Simons, Dick Meadows and "Doc" Cataldo. After the raid, he was the one that navigated the furor over the fact there were no prisoners at Son Tay.

After Vietnam 

He served as the assistant deputy director, Defense Communications Planning Group from August 1966 to August 1967, the assistant division commander, 82nd Airborne Division from September 1967 to October 1968, and the director of plans and programs, office of the Chief of Research and Development from October 1968 until his retirement in 1971.

Popular culture
Blackburn's exploits as a guerrilla leader during World War II in northern Luzon, Philippines, were chronicled in the book  Blackburn's Headhunters by Philip Harkins (W.W. Norton & Company Inc., 1955). The Harkins book was made into a film called Surrender - Hell!, with Keith Andes playing Blackburn and released in 1959 by Allied Artists films. Blackburn was the technical advisor on the film.

In retirement
Following his retirement from military service, Blackburn took a position with Braddock Dunn & McDonald, where he served as vice president, special projects until he retired in 1979.

He died in 2008 and was buried in Arlington National Cemetery.

Medals and decorations
Brig. Gen. Blackburn was awarded the Silver Star, the Legion of Merit with three Oak Leaf Clusters, Bronze Star, Army Commendation Medal, Air Medal, the Gold Star Medal (Philippines), the Medal of Merit (Philippines) and the Vietnam Army Distinguished Service Medal. He was authorized to wear the Distinguished Unit Citation with three Oak Leaf Clusters, the Philippines Presidential Unit Citation, the Combat Infantryman Badge.
Badges

Decorations

Unit Award

Service Medals

Foreign Awards

See also
List of American guerrillas in the Philippines
Russell W. Volckmann
USS Gar (SS-206)
Wendell Fertig
MACV-SOG
Son Tay

References

1916 births
2008 deaths
United States Army generals
United States Army personnel of World War II
Members of the United States Army Special Forces
American guerrillas of World War II
Philippine resistance against Japan
Recipients of the Distinguished Service Medal (US Army)
Recipients of the Silver Star
Recipients of the Legion of Merit
Recipients of the Air Medal
Recipients of the Military Merit Medal (Philippines)
Recipients of the Distinguished Service Order (Vietnam)
United States Army personnel of the Vietnam War